Halobiforma (common abbreviation: Hbf.) is a genus of halophilic archaea of the family Natrialbaceae.

References

Further reading

Scientific journals

Scientific books

Scientific databases

External links

Archaea genera